The men's pommel horse competition was one of eight events for male competitors in artistic gymnastics at the 1968 Summer Olympics in Mexico City. The event was held from 22 to 26 October at the Auditorio Nacional. There were 115 competitors from 27 nations, with nations in the team competition having up to 6 gymnasts and other nations entering up to 3 gymnasts. The event was won by Miroslav Cerar of Yugoslavia, the second man to successfully defend an Olympic pommel horse title. Olli Laiho of Finland took silver, while Mikhail Voronin of the Soviet Union finished with bronze. Japan's three-Games podium streak in the event ended, while the Soviet streak stretched to five Games.

Background

This was the 12th appearance of the event, which is one of the five apparatus events held every time there were apparatus events at the Summer Olympics (no apparatus events were held in 1900, 1908, 1912, or 1920). Only one of the six finalists from 1964 returned: gold medalist Miroslav Cerar of Yugoslavia. Cerar had added another world championship to his pommel horse resume in 1966 and was the favorite to repeat as Olympic champion. Mikhail Voronin of the Soviet Union had been the runner-up at the world championships.

Ecuador made its debut in the men's pommel horse; East and West Germany competed separately for the first time. The United States made its 11th appearance, most of any nation, having missed only the inaugural 1896 Games.

Competition format

Each nation entered a team of six gymnasts or up to three individual gymnasts. All entrants in the gymnastics competitions performed both a compulsory exercise and a voluntary exercise for each apparatus. The scores for all 12 exercises were summed to give an individual all-around score. (Three gymnasts who entered the all-around did not compete on the pommel horse.)

These exercise scores were also used for qualification for the new apparatus finals. The two exercises (compulsory and voluntary) for each apparatus were summed to give an apparatus score; the top 6 in each apparatus participated in the finals; others were ranked 7th through 114th. In the final, each gymnast performed an additional voluntary exercise; half of the score from the preliminary carried over.

Schedule

All times are Central Standard Time (UTC-6)

Results

References

Official Olympic Report
www.gymnasticsresults.com
www.gymn-forum.net

Men's pommel horse
Men's 1968
Men's events at the 1968 Summer Olympics